Kurash at the 2017 Asian Indoor and Martial Arts Games was held in Ashgabat, Turkmenistan from 20 to 22 September 2017 at the Martial Arts Arena.

Medalists

Men

Women

Medal table

Results

Men

60 kg
20 September

66 kg
21 September

73 kg
21 September

81 kg
21 September

90 kg
22 September

100 kg
22 September

+100 kg
22 September

Women

48 kg
22 September

52 kg
22 September

57 kg
22 September

63 kg
21 September

70 kg
21 September

78 kg
21 September

87 kg
20 September

+87 kg
20 September

References 
 Medalists by events

External links
 Official website

2017 Asian Indoor and Martial Arts Games events
2017